wxFormBuilder is an open source GUI designer application for wxWidgets toolkit, which allows creating cross-platform applications. A streamlined, easy to use interface enables faster development and easier maintenance of software. It is written in C++.

wxFormBuilder is a visual development tool, but also allows including non-graphical components. It can generate C++, Python, PHP, Lua and XRC code. The generated code cannot be edited directly in the program.

Event handlers
wxFormBuilder uses the Connect() method or the event table for creating events. For most of the available controls, custom event handlers can be created. Events can also be added through external XML files, eliminating the need to rebuild.

Available controls
wxFormBuilder have a rich set of supported widgets. They can be easily extended via plugins.

See also

 wxWidgets
 wxDev-C++
 WxGlade

References

External links
 
 Comparison of wxWidgets RAD solutions

Cross-platform software
Free computer libraries
Free software programmed in C++
Software that uses wxWidgets
User interface builders
User interface markup languages
WxWidgets